The Way of the Strong is a 1919 American silent drama film directed by Edwin Carewe and starring Anna Q. Nilsson, Joseph King, and Harry S. Northrup. It was released on March 17, 1919.

Cast list
 Anna Q. Nilsson as Audrie Hendrie and Monica Norton
 Joseph King as Alexander Hendrie
 Harry S. Northrup as James Leyburn
 Irene Yeager as Frank Hendrie as a child
 Arthur Redden as Frank Hendrie six years later
 Rita Harlan as Norah

References

External links

 
 
 

Films directed by Edwin Carewe
Metro Pictures films
American silent feature films
American black-and-white films
Silent American drama films
1919 drama films
1919 films
Films based on British novels
1910s American films